Commercial diplomacy is diplomacy that focuses on development of business between two countries. It aims at generating commercial gains in the form of trade and inward and outward investment by means of business and entrepreneurship promotion and facilitation activities in the host country.  Commercial diplomacy is pursued with the goal of gaining economic stability, welfare, or competitive advantage.

As a term, commercial diplomacy emerged in the second half of the twentieth century (e.g., Joseph, 1965; Corbet, 1972), but the concept certainly existed in previous centuries. In literature the concepts of economic diplomacy and commercial diplomacy are often used interchangeably. Definitions of both concepts vary, and consequently the relationship between them is also described differently. Some authors argue that commercial diplomacy is a subset of economic diplomacy. It is certain, however, that both kinds of diplomacy are "irrevocably intertwined" and thus "distinct [but] obviously closely related to [each other]".

Purpose
Commercial diplomacy emphasizes the government's role, being defined as "a government service to the business community, which aims at the development of socially beneficial international business ventures".  It is "the work of diplomatic missions in support of the home country's business and finance sectors and includes the promotion of inward and outward investment, as well as trade". Commercial diplomacy thus includes "all aspects of business support and promotion" including investment, tourism, R&D, and intellectual property.

Commercial diplomacy is designed to influence foreign government policy and regulatory decisions that affect global trade, investment and commerce. It is concerned with government regulations and actions that affect international commerce—including standards in areas such as health, safety, the environment, and consumer protection; regulations covering services such as banking, telecommunications and accounting; competition policy and laws concerning bribery and corruption; agricultural support programs; and industrial subsidies. Potter (2004) argues that commercial diplomacy is a value-creating activity due to its usefulness in dealing with managerial and government concerns.

In this context, commercial diplomacy is profitable in that it makes exporting and operating abroad easier; it is a valuable instrument for export promotion and operating abroad; it enables companies to perform tasks abroad more quickly and increases the amount of exports and company results by providing information about rules, regulations, culture, public tenders and the market of the host country; by providing support during the partner search; and by providing assistance in trade disputes, fairs, and missions. Especially for companies that have financial limitations, access to reliable information and a broad network abroad are essential.

Activities
Traditional commercial diplomacy activities include facilitating, negotiating, promoting and arbitrating international trade, investment, intellectual property and commerce, and advocating Responsible Commercial Diplomacy (RCD), together with networking, capacity building, intelligence, image campaigns and support. These activities are shown in the table below.

Other activities for commercial diplomacy and rationales that companies need are: need for access to reliable and neutral business information; credibility and image support in foreign markets; partner search; conflict handling; support of home country delegations (state missions); strategic concerns (e.g., energy).

See also

 Defence diplomacy

Economic diplomacy
Energy diplomacy
 Medical diplomacy
Public diplomacy
Public diplomacy

References

Further reading 

 Knopp, H. (2004), Commercial Diplomacy and the National Interest, American Academy of Diplomacy. .
 Ruël, H., ed., (2012), Commercial Diplomacy in International Entrepreneurship, Emerald Group Publishing. .
 United Nations, (2019), A Guide to Commercial Diplomacy, United Nations Publications, .

Types of diplomacy